Maraq (Arabic: مرق) is a Yemeni dish. The word itself simply means "broth" in Arabic. It originated in Yemen. This dish is also found in Somalia and Oman.

Preparation 
The process of cooking maraq would usually begin by boiling some meat with some spices and onions. After the meat is tender and cooked, it is served on a bed of rice. The resulting maraq broth would be served in a bowl on the side. It is also common to squeeze fresh lime into the maraq as it cools down for additional flavor. Maraq can also be found in Somalia, Ethiopia, Oman, Yemen and other Arab countries in the Persian Gulf region.

See also
 List of chicken dishes
 List of lamb dishes

References

Yemeni cuisine